Zhu Yingfu (born 12 July 1941) is a Chinese engineer and general designer of the Type 052B destroyer, Type 052C destroyer and Chinese aircraft carrier Liaoning.

Early life 
On July 12, 1941, Zhu was born in Shanghai, China. Zhu's ancestral home is in Ningbo, Zhejiang.

Education 
In 1963, Zhu earned a bachelor's degree in Naval Architectures from Shanghai Jiao Tong University (SJTU). In 1966, Zhu earned a master's degree from SJTU.

Career 
Zhu started his engineering career at 701st Research Institute.
In 1982, Zhu became a visiting scholar in at University of California, Berkeley, where he researched in the area of ship hydrodynamics.
In 2011, Zhu was elected an academician of the Chinese Academy of Engineering (CAE). On September 25, 2012, Zhu became general designer of Chinese aircraft carrier Liaoning. By 2018, Zhu is a chief designer of Liaoning.

Awards
 First Prize of the National Science and Technology Progress Award
 Second Prize of the National Science and Technology Progress Award
 Science and Technology Award of the Ho Leung Ho Lee Foundation

See also 
 Chen Bingde
 Liu Zhe, Captain of Liaoning.

References

External links 
 Chinese Shipbuilding Heavy Industry Corporation (CSIC)
 Zhu Yingfu will speak at Wanshan Forum in November 2018

1941 births
Living people
Engineers from Shanghai
Shanghai Jiao Tong University alumni
Members of the Chinese Academy of Engineering
Chinese naval architects